Yulia Nikolayevna Koltunova (born 4 May 1989 in Volgograd) is a Russian diver. Competing in the 2004 Summer Olympics, she won a silver medal in the women's synchronized 10 metre platform with teammate Natalia Goncharova.

She also competed at the 2012 Summer Olympics.

References

1989 births
Russian female divers
Divers at the 2004 Summer Olympics
Divers at the 2012 Summer Olympics
Olympic divers of Russia
Medalists at the 2004 Summer Olympics
Olympic medalists in diving
Olympic silver medalists for Russia
Sportspeople from Volgograd
Living people
Universiade medalists in diving
Universiade gold medalists for Russia
Medalists at the 2013 Summer Universiade